The 2022 Christy Ring Cup is the 18th staging of the Christy Ring Cup since its establishment by the Gaelic Athletic Association in 2005. The cup began on 9 April 2022 and ended on 21 May 2022.

London returned to the competition after a 2 year hiatus due to the impact of the COVID-19 pandemic on Gaelic games. Kildare replaced 2021 champions Offaly in the competition, having come last in the Joe McDonagh Cup in 2021 while Mayo were promoted into the competition, having won the Nicky Rackard Cup in 2021, replacing Roscommon, who finished last in 2021.

The 2022 Christy Ring Cup is played on a Round-Robin basis. The counties who finish in the top two places shall qualify for the final, with the winner being promoted to the Joe McDonagh Cup. The bottom placed team in the Round Robin is relegated to the Nicky Rackard Cup.

Kildare player Niall Ó Muineacháin scored an own goal against London in the opening minute of their game.

Team changes

To Championship 
Relegated from the Joe McDonagh Cup

 Kildare

Promoted from the Nicky Rackard Cup

 Mayo

From Championship 
Promoted to the Joe McDonagh Cup

 Offaly

Relegated to the Nicky Rackard Cup

 Roscommon

Team information

Personnel and general information

Group stage

Group stage table

Fixtures and results

Round 1

Round 2

Round 3

Round 4

Round 5

Knockout stage

Final

Kildare are promoted to the 2023 Joe McDonagh Cup.

Top scorers

Top Scorer Overall

In a single game

References 

Christy Ring Cup
Christy Ring Cup